A surcoat or surcote is an outer garment that was commonly worn in the Middle Ages by soldiers. It was worn over armor to show insignia and help identify what side the soldier was on. In the battlefield the surcoat was also helpful with keeping the sun off the soldier and their armor which helped prevent heat stroke and heat exhaustion. The name derives from French meaning "over the coat", a long, loose, often sleeveless coat reaching down to the feet.

History

Men's surcoat
From about the late 12th century, knights wore long, flowing surcoats. From the early to mid 13th century, these were frequently emblazoned with their personal arms, over their armour. These usually extended to about mid-calf, had slits in the bottom front and back, allowing the wearer to ride comfortably, and were either sleeved or sleeveless. Historians believe that the practice of wearing white surcoats was adopted during the Crusades, their main  purpose being to reflect the direct sun, which overheated the armour (and the soldier inside) – although it may be argued that here its color would have been of little help, while in poor weather they helped keep rain and the muck of battle away from the easily corroded mail links. The surcoat displayed the device of the knight (origin of the term "coat of arms"), thereby identifying him, which in turn, combined with the increased use of the great helm (late 12th century, early 13th century), became an essential means of recognition. Indeed, some historians cite this as one of the reasons behind the spread of heraldry across medieval Europe. In the early fourteenth century, the front of the knight's surcoat was shortened so that it was longer at the back and knee-length at the front,  allowing greater freedom of movement and eliminating the danger of a rider getting his spurs caught in the garment. By the mid-fourteenth century, it was replaced with the "jupon" (or "gipon"), a much shorter item, often padded for supplementary protection.

In the 15th century, once suits of plate armour became common, the surcoat was phased out of use.  This period in the history of armour development, in which surcoats became increasingly rare, is referred to as the "surcoatless period" (1420-1485).

Women's surcoat
Women began wearing surcoats during the 13th century, both with and without sleeves. A particular style, known as the sideless surcoat, developed as a fashion in the 14th century. This was a sleeveless, floor-length garment featuring exaggerated armholes, which at their most extreme were open from shoulder to hip, revealing the gown underneath. The narrow strip covering the torso, known as the plackard, was usually no more than a foot wide. The style drew criticism from some moralists, who thought the garment drew an inappropriate amount of attention to the female body. Despite this, sideless surcoats continued to be worn as ceremonial dress well into the 15th century, long after they had ceased to be fashionable. Some estimates place them being worn as state apparel as late as 1525.

Gallery

See also

Tabard

Footnotes

Sources
Nunn, Joan, Fashion in costume, 1200-2000, New Amsterdam Books, 2000, 

12th-century fashion
13th-century fashion
14th-century fashion
15th-century fashion
Medieval European costume
History of clothing (Western fashion)
History of fashion
Heraldry